Ceryerda is a monotypic genus of Australian ground spiders containing the single species, Ceryerda cursitans. It was first described by Eugène Simon in 1909, and has only been found in Australia.

References

Gnaphosidae
Monotypic Araneomorphae genera
Spiders of Australia
Taxa named by Eugène Simon